"Call the Police" is a song by American rock band LCD Soundsystem. It was released together with "American Dream" as a digital double A-side single on May 5, 2017, through DFA Records and Columbia Records, as the lead single from their fourth studio album, American Dream (2017). The song peaked at number 78 in Scotland and number 26 on the Billboard Hot Rock Songs chart.

Background and composition
Prior to the official release of the song, "Call the Police" was first performed live during one of the band's sets at the then-recently opened Brooklyn Steel venue in Brooklyn, New York. It was performed during the first encore of their April 6 show, where it was known as "Call Police" on the setlist. The band had made a plea to those in attendance at the show, asking them not to film their performance so they could officially release the track the way they wish to do so.

"Call the Police" was mixed by Dave Sardy at his studio in Los Angeles and mastered by Bob Weston at Chicago Mastering Service. The track has been noted as a post-punk song by some music critics. Eric Shorey of Nylon felt as though the song didn't deviate too far away from the band's general style of music, noting that "it's not hard to imagine the new jam entering the canon of dance-punk classics." The track drew comparisons to the work of David Bowie; James Murphy's vocals were compared to Bowie's, the guitars were noted as similar to those of his song "'Heroes'", and Rhian Daly of NME wrote that the song "shares the galactic explorer feel of some of Bowie‘s finest work," using his "Moonage Daydream" track as an example. Comparisons were also drawn to U2.

Release
"Call the Police" was released alongside "American Dream" as a double A-side single digitally on May 5, 2017; they were made available once midnight was reached in one's time zone. The release acts as the band's first non-Christmas single in seven years (if "Christmas Will Break Your Heart" is not counted). The single release was accompanied by a post on the band's official Facebook page, which also included an update regarding the progress of their upcoming studio album. The band later performed "Call the Police" during the May 6 episode of Saturday Night Lives 42nd season.

Track listing

Personnel
All personnel adapted from American Dream liner notes.
 James Murphy — vocals, drums, Roland TR-33, snaps, bass guitar, guitar, piano, ARP Odyssey, EMS Synthi AKS, ARP Omni II, Oberheim SEM
 Al Doyle — Korg Delta, guitar, vocals
 Korey Richey — vocals
 Dave Sardy — mixing

Charts

References

LCD Soundsystem songs
Songs written by James Murphy (electronic musician)
2017 singles
2017 songs
Columbia Records singles
Dance-punk songs
Songs written by Al Doyle